The Treaty establishing a Constitution for Europe was signed in Rome on 29 October 2004 by 53 senior political figures from the 25 member states of the European Union. In most cases heads of state designated plenipotentiaries to sign the treaty, but some presidents also signed on behalf of states which were republics. Most designated plenipotentiaries were prime ministers and foreign ministers.

List of signatories
 For President Heinz Fischer of Austria:
 Wolfgang Schüssel, Chancellor
 Ursula Plassnik, Minister for Foreign Affairs
 For King Albert II of Belgium:
 Guy Verhofstadt, Prime Minister
 Karel De Gucht, Minister for Foreign Affairs
 For President Tassos Papadopoulos of Cyprus:
 Tassos Papadopoulos, President
 George Iacovou, Minister for Foreign Affairs
 For President Václav Klaus of the Czech Republic:
 Stanislav Gross, Prime Minister
 Cyril Svoboda, Minister for Foreign Affairs
 For Queen Margrethe II of Denmark:
 Anders Fogh Rasmussen, Prime Minister
 Per Stig Møller, Minister for Foreign Affairs
 For President Arnold Rüütel of Estonia:
 Juhan Parts, Prime Minister
 Kristiina Ojuland, Minister for Foreign Affairs
 For President Tarja Halonen of Finland:
 Matti Vanhanen, Prime Minister
 Erkki Tuomioja, Minister for Foreign Affairs
 For President Jacques Chirac of France:
 Jacques Chirac, President
 Jean-Pierre Raffarin, Prime Minister
 Michel Barnier, Minister of Foreign Affairs
 For President Horst Köhler of Germany:
 Gerhard Schröder, Chancellor
 Joschka Fischer, Minister of Foreign Affairs and Deputy Chancellor
 For President Costis Stephanopoulos of Greece:
 Kostas Karamanlis, Prime Minister
 Petros Molyviatis, Minister of Foreign Affairs
 For President Ferenc Mádl of Hungary:
 Ferenc Gyurcsány, Prime Minister
 László Kovács, Minister for Foreign Affairs
 For President Mary McAleese of Ireland:
 Bertie Ahern, Taoiseach
 Dermot Ahern, Minister for Foreign Affairs
 For President Carlo Azeglio Ciampi of Italy:
 Silvio Berlusconi, Prime Minister
 Franco Frattini, Minister for Foreign Affairs
 For President Vaira Vīķe-Freiberga of Latvia:
 Vaira Vīķe-Freiberga, President
 Indulis Emsis, Prime Minister
 Artis Pabriks, Minister for Foreign Affairs
 For President Valdas Adamkus of Lithuania:
 Valdas Adamkus, President
 Algirdas Mykolas Brazauskas, Prime Minister
 Antanas Valionis, Minister of Foreign Affairs
 For Grand Duke Henri of Luxembourg:
 Jean-Claude Juncker, Prime Minister
 Jean Asselborn, Deputy Prime Minister and Minister for Foreign Affairs and Immigration
 For President Eddie Fenech Adami of Malta:
 Lawrence Gonzi, Prime Minister
 Michael Frendo, Minister for Foreign Affairs
 For Queen Beatrix of the Netherlands:
 Jan Peter Balkenende, Prime Minister
 Bernard Bot, Minister for Foreign Affairs
 For President Aleksander Kwaśniewski of Poland:
 Marek Belka, Prime Minister
 Włodzimierz Cimoszewicz, Minister for Foreign Affairs
 For President Jorge Sampaio of Portugal:
 Pedro Miguel de Santana Lopes, Prime Minister
 António Victor Martins Monteiro, Minister for Foreign Affairs and the Portuguese Communities
 For President Ivan Gašparovič of Slovakia:
 Mikuláš Dzurinda, Prime Minister
 Eduard Kukan, Minister for Foreign Affairs
 For President Janez Drnovšek of Slovenia:
 Anton Rop, Prime Minister
 Ivo Vajgl, Minister for Foreign Affairs
 For King Juan Carlos I of Spain:
 José Luis Rodríguez Zapatero, President of the Government
 Miguel Ángel Moratinos Cuyaubé, Minister for External Affairs and Cooperation
 For the Government of the Kingdom of Sweden:
 Göran Persson, Prime Minister
 Laila Freivalds, Minister for Foreign Affairs
 For Queen Elizabeth II of the United Kingdom:
 Tony Blair, Prime Minister
 Jack Straw, Secretary of State for Foreign and Commonwealth Affairs

Candidate countries
Representatives of three candidate countries also signed the Final Act of the treaty as observers.

 From Bulgaria:
 Simeon Saxe-Coburg-Gotha, Prime Minister
 Solomon Passy, Minister for Foreign Affairs
 From Romania:
 Ion Iliescu, President
 Mircea Geoană, Minister for Foreign Affairs
 From Turkey:
 Recep Tayyip Erdoğan, Prime Minister
 Abdullah Gül, Minister for Foreign Affairs

Croatian representatives attended the ceremony but did not sign.

Treaty establishing a Constitution for Europe